Knox Institute and Industrial School was a private elementary and secondary school in Athens, Georgia for African Americans. It was open from 1868 until 1928. Alumni include Monroe Morton, a builder and real estate businessman whose legacy includes the Morton Building in Athens, and Charles W. Chappelle. The school was named for Major John J. Knox of the Freedmen's Bureau. The federal agency helped fund the school. Athens' first African American Postmaster, Madison Davis, was one of those who helped purchase property for the school.

History 

The Knox Institute and Industrial School was a private school at the corner of Reese Street and Pope Streets in Athens. Originally known as Knox School, it developed as a trade school offering training in carpentry, painting and other skills. It also prepared students to attend Historically Black Colleges. The campus included a building donated by Andrew Carnegie. There was also a boys and girls dormitory for students who did not live nearby.

Athens High and Industrial School
Athens High and Industrial School, originally Reese Street School, took over the Knox campus in 1933. It was the first four-year public high school for African Americans in Georgia. A historic marker was added to the site in 2010.

Alumni
Monroe Morton
Hall Johnson
Charles W. Chappelle

References

External links 

1868 establishments in Georgia (U.S. state)
1928 disestablishments in Georgia (U.S. state)
Private elementary schools in Georgia (U.S. state)
Private middle schools in Georgia (U.S. state)
Historically black schools
Schools in Clarke County, Georgia